Lori Cramer (born 8 March 1993) is an Australian rugby union player. She plays Fullback for the NSW Waratahs in the Super W competition.

Biography 
Cramer was named in Australia's squad for two two-test series against Japan and then New Zealand. She came off the bench in her international debut on 13th July 2019 in the first test against Japan. She started in the second test match as the Wallaroos won the series with a 46–3 victory.

In August 2019, Cramer started in both matches against the Black Ferns.

Cramer was selected for the Wallaroos squad for test matches against Fiji and Japan in May 2022. She was named in the squad for the 2022 Pacific Four Series. She started against the Black Ferns in the opening match of the Pacific Four series on 6 June.

Cramer was named in the Wallaroos squad for a two-test series against the Black Ferns at the Laurie O'Reilly Cup. She was selected in the team again for the delayed 2022 Rugby World Cup in New Zealand.

References

External links
Wallaroos Profile

1993 births
Living people
Australia women's international rugby union players
Australian female rugby union players